This list of tallest buildings in Busan ranks skyscrapers in the South Korean city of Busan by height. Most of the city's tallest buildings are concentrated in Marine City and Centum City, an area just west of the famed Haeundae beach. However, there are also skyscrapers in other districts, such as the Busan International Financial Center in the Nam-Gu district.

Tallest buildings
This lists ranks Busan's skyscrapers that stand at least 150m tall, based on standard height measurement. This includes spires and architectural details but does not include antenna masts. Existing structures are included for ranking purposes based on present height.

Timeline of tallest buildings in Busan

Tallest buildings under construction 
This lists buildings that are under construction in Busan and are planned to rise at least . Buildings that have been topped out but are not completed are also included.

Tallest proposed or approved
This lists ranks Busan's skyscrapers over 150m that are currently proposed/approved for construction.

External links 
 Tallest buildings of Busan on Emporis
 Buildings of Busan on Skyscraperpage

Busan
Buildings and structures in Busan